Collingwood Park is a suburb of Ipswich in the City of Ipswich, Queensland, Australia.

Geography
Its eastern boundary is delineated by Goodna Creek and the western boundary by Six Mile Creek. Housing development began circa 1980 with the establishment of two HIA display villages. Redbank Plaza is a large shopping mall, located on the northern boundary of the suburb. The main thoroughfare is Collingwood Drive which runs south from the shopping centre.

History
The suburb was named and bounded on 28 August 1982.

Throughout the 1980s, Collingwood Park was marketed as, "The Dress Circle Suburb of Ipswich". The suburb's name implied a "leafy" residential area which differentiated it from nearby Redbank, the site of several collieries and industries: a map, c1940, showed the area as devoid of any development apart from a perimeter road.

Notable events which drew attention to the area included 13th Australian Scout Jamboree, 1982–83, the annual  Collingwood Park fun run and the 1983 radio 4BK house giveaway and concert held on the site of the current state school.

Collingwood Park State School opened on 28 January 1986.

WoodLinks State School opened on 1 January 2011.

At the  Collingwood Park recorded a population of 6,622 people.

Education

Collingwood Park State School is a government primary (Prep-6) school for boys and girls on the corner of Burrel and Hannant Streets. In 2017, the school had an enrolment of 558 students with 45 teachers (37 full-time equivalent) and 23 non-teaching staff (16 full-time equivalent). It includes a special education program.

WoodLinks State School is a government primary (Prep-6) school for boys and girls at WoodLinks Way. In 2017, the school had an enrolment of 608 students with 41 teachers (38 full-time equivalent) and 28 non-teaching staff (18 full-time equivalent). It includes a special education program.

There are no secondary schools in Collingwood Park. The nearest secondary schools are in Redbank Plains and Bellbird Park.

Flora and fauna
Collingwood Park and its surrounds are within the catchment area identified as the Six Mile, Woogaroo and Goodna Creek (SWAG). Over 1300 species of plants, including grass trees and hoop pines, and animals including reptiles, mammals, birds, fish and insects have been recorded in the SWAG Catchment area, with approximately 90% being native species. Exotic, or introduced, species include: blue billygoat weed, groundsel, Chinese elm, salvinia, lantana, camphor laurel, cane toad, spotted turtle dove, common myna, fox and hare.

Some of the rare, endangered and vulnerable species recorded around Collingwood Park include: the Powerful owl (Ninox strenua), Black-chinned honeyeater (Melithreptus gularis), Glossy black cockatoo (Calyptorhynchus lathami) and the Grey goshawk (Accipiter
novaehollandiae).

Transport
Collingwood Park has on and off ramps to the M7 Ipswich Motorway going both east to Brisbane and west to Ipswich. The suburb has several regular Translink bus services.

Governance
Ipswich City Council operates a public library at Redbank Plaza. Collingwood Park is in the Ipswich City Council Division 3.  Lance McCallum is the State Member for Bundamba, Collingwood Park is in the Federal seats of Oxley represented by Milton Dick and Blair represented by Shane Neumann.

Parks and recreation
Dodrill Park on Whitlam Drive, is named after a highly regarded local resident, Mitch Dodrill, who has lived in Collingwood Park since 1979, and has represented Collingwood Park residents in many local matters. His son Jim Dodrill continues to represent the residents of Collingwood Park in matters of importance. 

Goupong Park on Namatjira Drive, Robert Anderson was a Ugarapul tribal man and was known by his tribal name "Goupong", meaning frog in the Ugarapul language. This was the language of the traditional people and custodians of the land known today as Ipswich. Robert Anderson was raised at the old Deebing Creek Mission Station and worked on many properties throughout Queensland as a young man. His athletic ability was recognised when he defeated world – record holder Arthur Postle of Pittsworth in a sprint on the Charters Towers goldfields in 1904. Many of his descendants still remain in the traditional country of this great Ugarapul man today.

The Strike Monument commemorates The first strike in Queensland which took place at the Redbank Mine owned by Campbell and Towns. On 7 June 1861, a deputation of miners confronted Robert Campbell with demands including a pay rise of one shilling a ton. Campbell rejected the claims, the miners went on strike and were later arrested and tried for illegally conspiring to injure Campbell's interests. The jury found them not guilty. 
The park also has a skate/BMX bowl and other facilities, and is a popular recreational location for the young people of the suburb.

Banjo Patterson Park on Laurie Drive, has barbecues, a cricket pitch for social matches, a half court basketball court, and a leash-free dog running area.  Both Goupong and Banjo Patterson Park are popular venues for children's parties and other social gatherings.  Bailey Street Reserve is a large, temporarily named council reserve which runs from Bailey street to Six Mile Creek. It covers an area which once contained an open cut coal mine. Where it meets the creek, there is a significant freshwater lagoon which is an important habitat for several species of water fowl and a number of other species have been classified as rare, endangered or vulnerable under the Queensland Nature Conservation Act 1992 and Nature Conservation (Wildlife) Regulation 1994.

References

External links
 

Suburbs of Ipswich, Queensland
1982 establishments in Australia